The White Screen is an Israeli indie pop-rock cult band . The band consists of cousins Gabriel and Gilbert Broid, Noa Ayali, Nimshi, Udi Naor and former drummer Stav Ben Shahar. The band is one of Israel's most interesting cult bands with three albums under their belt, the latest of which, Sex, Drugs & Palestine, was recognized as an iconic album with all vinyl copies being sold out. The band has been described as a retro 1980s, punk band.

History

Gabriel Broid was born in the United States and later moved to Brussels. At age ten, he moved to Israel. His cousin, Gilbert, was born in Jerusalem. As teenagers the two used to dress up and imitate the musicians which they admired.

In a 2019 interview, lead singer Gabriel Broid described that their song "Jerusalem" came to him while riding on the 480 bus from Jerusalem to Tel Aviv.

Musical influences
The White Screen has noted Lou Reed, Velvet Underground and David Bowie as some of their musical influences. They have also stated that they loved Glam Rock.

Personnel

Members 
 Gabriel Broid (vocals)
 Gilbert Broid (guitar)
 Stav Ben Shahar (drums)

Discography
 The White Screen (2016)
 Death to Techno (2018)
 Sex, Drugs & Palestine (2019)

References

External links
White Screen

Israeli indie rock groups
Israeli punk rock groups
Musical groups established in 2016
Musical groups from Tel Aviv
2016 establishments in Israel